Gaston Dubosc (1861–1941) was a French stage and film actor.

Selected filmography
 A Gentleman of the Ring (1932)
 A Son from America (1932)
 The Red Robe (1933)
 Once Upon a Time (1933)
 A Day Will Come (1934)
 The Secret of Woronzeff (1934)
 The Devil in the Bottle (1935)
 Pasteur (1935)
 Royal Waltz (1936)
 The Secret of Polichinelle (1936)
 The King (1936)
 My Father Was Right (1936)
 Beethoven's Great Love (1937)
 The Pearls of the Crown (1937)
 Nine Bachelors (1939)
 Sarajevo (1940)

References

Bibliography
 Goble, Alan. The Complete Index to Literary Sources in Film. Walter de Gruyter, 1999.

External links

1861 births
1941 deaths
French male film actors
French male silent film actors
20th-century French male actors
Male actors from Paris